Kensington is the name of several places in New Zealand:

Kensington, Dunedin, a suburb of Dunedin in the South Island
Kensington, Timaru, a suburb of Timaru in the South Island
Kensington, Whangārei, a suburb of Whangārei in the North Island